The Dream Center is a Pentecostal network of community centers in Los Angeles, California, established in 1994. The president of Dream Center is Matthew Barnett.

History

The organization was founded in 1994 by Matthew Barnett and Tommy Barnett of Dream City Church as a home missions project of the Southern California District of the Assemblies of God.

In 1996, after purchasing the old Queen of Angels Hospital in  Echo Park Downtown Los Angeles, it transformed it into social center for the homeless, prostitutes and members of street gangs. 

In 2001, Pastor Matthew Barnett and the International Church of the Foursquare Gospel merged the Dream Center with the Angelus Temple, making Barnett the senior pastor over Angelus Temple as well as the Dream Center.

Associated Dream Centers have been established in other cities. As of 2022, the organization has established 84 centers in other cities and countries around the world.

Programs
Dream Center offers a food bank, clothings and
assistance programs for disaster victims, victims of domestic violence, drug addiction and trafficking in human beings and prisoners.

Controversy
In 2005, some Hurricane Katrina evacuees staying at the Dream Center said they had difficulty receiving donations.  In response to the complaints several social activists, led by Ted Hayes, an advocate for the homeless, called a news conference demanding an investigation of the Dream Center. After visiting the Dream Center, however, and being given a tour of the facility, the activists concluded that the accusations were groundless. In fact, they were found to be from a smear campaign. "There is no basis to the complaints we've heard," Hayes said, "The horror stories reported to us do not exist."

In 2017, a subsidiary of the Dream Center, in partnership with a private equity fund, purchased the Art Institutes, South University, and Argosy University systems of for-profit colleges from Education Management Corporation. The transaction received significant scrutiny, due to concerns about Dream Center's ability to successfully manage the acquired schools, and criticism that the transaction was designed to allow the schools to avoid increased regulation of for-profit colleges.   The transaction, which was not approved by the Department of Education under the  Obama Administration, was approved in 2017 by Secretary of Education Betsy DeVos. In 2019, at least 30 of the art institutes and related colleges were closed, with some closures announced abruptly in the middle of the academic year.  Some of the Art Institute programs were transferred to Studio Enterprise, a Los Angeles creative arts  training firm funded by principals of the  private equity firm Colbeck Capital Management.

References

External links

Christian missions in North America
Christian organizations established in 1993
Religious organizations based in the United States
Echo Park, Los Angeles